John M. Beasley House is a house at 7706 Westmoreland Drive, Sarasota, Florida in Manatee County which was built in Mediterranean Revival style in 1926. It was added to the National Register of Historic Places in 1996.

It is a two-story, frame residence covered with stucco, upon a concrete foundation.  It has a gable roof with barrel tile sections and it has flat roof sections.  Some shallow eaves are supported by simple wood brackets.  The property also includes a non-contributing garage.

It is located in the Whitfield Estates Subdivision.

References

National Register of Historic Places in Manatee County, Florida
Houses on the National Register of Historic Places in Florida